The Earle R. Taylor House and Peach Packing Shed, in Greenville County, South Carolina, near Greer, South Carolina. It was listed on the National Register of Historic Places on June 27, 2012.

See also
List of packing houses

References

National Register of Historic Places in Greenville County, South Carolina
Packing houses
Buildings and structures in Greenville County, South Carolina
Greer, South Carolina